Chuchelná is a municipality and village in Opava District in the Moravian-Silesian Region of the Czech Republic. It has about 1,200 inhabitants. It is part of the historic Hlučín Region.

History
The first written mention of Chuchelná is from 1349. From 1742 the village belonged to Prussia after Maria Theresa had been defeated. In 1920, it became part of the newly established Czechoslovakia.

Notable people
Karl Max, Prince Lichnowsky (1860–1928), German diplomat; died here

References

External links

Villages in Opava District
Hlučín Region
Lichnowsky